Sapozhok is a rural locality (a khutor) in Mirnoye Rural Settlement, Novonikolayevsky District, Volgograd Oblast, Russia. The population was 66 as of 2010. There are 2 streets.

Geography 
Sapozhok is located in steppe, on the Khopyorsko-Buzulukskaya Plain, 54 km northeast of Novonikolayevsky (the district's administrative centre) by road. Mirny is the nearest rural locality.

References 

Rural localities in Novonikolayevsky District